Partee Records was a daughter label of Stax Records which was specialized in comedy music.

See also
 List of record labels

Defunct record labels of the United States
Comedy record labels